Antonio 'Toni' Jesús Seoane Ochoa (born 30 May 1989) is a Spanish footballer who plays for Villarrubia CF as a midfielder.

Club career
Born in Córdoba, Andalusia, Seoane made his senior debuts with Real Zaragoza B in the 2008–09 season, in the Tercera División. In January 2009 he joined Córdoba CF, being assigned to the reserves also in the fourth division. On 16 June 2010 he made his professional debut with the latter's main squad, playing the last minutes of the 1–0 away win against CD Castellón in the Segunda División.

In July 2010 Seoane signed with neighbouring Lucena CF of the Segunda División B. However, in January 2012, he returned to Córdoba B after being sparingly used.

On 15 August 2013 Seoane signed with another club in his native region, Xerez CD of the Tercera División.

References

External links

1989 births
Living people
Footballers from Córdoba, Spain
Spanish footballers
Association football midfielders
Segunda División players
Segunda División B players
Tercera División players
Real Zaragoza B players
Córdoba CF B players
Córdoba CF players
Lucena CF players
Xerez CD footballers
Arandina CF players
SD Amorebieta footballers
Novelda CF players
Villarrubia CF players